T. lepidus may refer to:
 Tauala lepidus, a spider species in the genus Tauala
 Timon lepidus, a lizard species
 Tinodon lepidus, an extinct mammal species in the genus Tinodon from the Late Jurassic
 Trachycephalus lepidus, a frog species

See also
 Lepidus (disambiguation)